Meriania is a genus of flowering plants in the family Melastomataceae. There are about 93 species distributed from Mexico to Brazil and the Antilles.

Plants of this genus are woody shrubs or trees with large flowers and capsules. The genus was named in honor of naturalist and scientific illustrator Maria Sibylla Merian.

Species include:
 Meriania acostae Wurdack
 Meriania almedae Wurdack
 Meriania ampla Wurdack
 Meriania amplexicaulis Wurdack
 Meriania barbosae
 Meriania campii Wurdack
 Meriania costata Wurdack
 Meriania crassiramis (Naudin) Wurdack
 Meriania cuneifolia Gleason
 Meriania denticulata (Gleason) Wurdack
 Meriania drakei (Cogn.) Wurdack
 Meriania fantastica
 Meriania franciscana
 Meriania furvanthera Wurdack
 Meriania grandiflora (Standl.) Almeda
 Meriania kirkbridei Wurdack
 Meriania leucantha (Sw.) Sw.
 Meriania loxensis Gleason
 Meriania maguirei Wurdack
 Meriania panamensis Woods. & Schery
 Meriania pastazana Wurdack
 Meriania peltata L.Uribe
 Meriania pichinchensis Wurdack
 Meriania rigida (Benth.) Triana
 Meriania stellata (Gleason) Wurdack
 Meriania versicolor L.Uribe

References

 
Melastomataceae genera
Taxonomy articles created by Polbot
Taxa named by Olof Swartz